Pudhumai Penn, officially released as AVMin Pudhumai Penn, is a 1984 Indian Tamil-language drama film directed by Bharathiraja and produced by AVM Productions. The film stars Pandiyan and Revathi. It was released on 14 July 1984.

Plot 
Seetha (Revathi) lives a simple life with her father (Ra. Sankaran), a tamil teacher in a village. Seetha has an elder sister who commits suicide unable to bear the dowry harassment from her husband’s family. Seetha’s father struggles to find a suitable groom for Seetha owing to his poor financial condition. One day, Seetha’s father meets Ramachandran alias Ram, a bank employee and likes him for his good nature. After a few days, Ram meets Seetha and love blossoms between them and they decide to get married. However, Ram’s mother doesn’t like Seetha as she didn’t bring any dowry and she keeps insulting Seetha frequently. But, Seetha decides to tolerate the hardships she faces due to the love she has for Ram. Seetha’s father commits suicide unable to see her daughter’s sufferings. Rajasekar (Dr. Rajasekar), a womanizer is the newly appointed bank manager where Ram works. Ram invites his boss Rajasekar to his home for lunch. Rajasekar gets attracted towards Seetha, however, Seetha understands Rajasekar’s cruel mindset and keeps distance with him. Ram’s sister’s becomes pregnant because of Ram’s friend (Y Gee Mahendran) and the families decide to get them married soon. Unable to meet the wedding expenses, Ram takes some money from the bank but gets caught by Rajasekar and threatens to inform the police. Rajasekar gives an option to Ram whereby if Ram allows him to have a physical relationship with Seetha, he would forgive Ram and not inform the police about the theft. However, this angers Ram and he beats up Rajasekar and leaves home.
Next day, Rajasekar is found dead and Ram gets arrested by the police on the accusation of murdering Rajasekar. Seetha decides to seek help from David (Prathap Pothen), a criminal lawyer who has once come to meet Seetha’s father and is kind hearted. To her shock, David’s whereabouts are unknown. She learns that David has moved out of his home sometime back. Seetha finds another lawyer to appear for Ram, but struggles to pay the legal expenses. Now, a painting artist spots Seetha and requests her to pose as a model for his paintings for which she agrees. This helps Seetha to earn some money and she manages to meet the legal expenses. She also helps managing the family expenses which include Ram’s mother and sister. However, Ram’s mother speaks ill about Seetha always that she goes to a brothel to earn money. 
One day, the painting artist requests Seetha to pose nude for a painting which angers her. Seetha shouts at the artist and leaves the place. Now, Seetha starts doing all sorts of odd jobs such as cook, household maid etc. at various places to earn money. While travelling in a bus, Seetha spots David and follows him to his home. She requests David to appear in court on behalf of Ram. Seetha narrates the whole story where Ram got arrested for Rajasekar’s death. David tells that it was him who killed Rajasekar and apologizes to Seetha for Ram getting caught in the case. David tells a flashback where Rajasekar was his friend once and he raped David’s visually challenged sister which led to her death. To avenge the death of his sister, David killed Rajasekar. 
David appears in the court and informs the truth to the judge which led to Ram’s release from prison. Meanwhile, Seetha learns that she is pregnant and happily waits to meet Ram and inform about her pregnancy. However, Ram’s mother speaks ill about Seetha to Ram. When Ram comes home from prison, he behaves strangely towards Seetha. When Seetha informs about her pregnancy, Ram questions about the father of the baby. This angers Seetha and she decides to end her life. However, Bharathiyar’s quotes come to her mind and she changes her mind. She decides to walk away from their home and lead an independent life.
.

Cast 
 Pandiyan as Ramachandran
 Revathi as Seetha
 Pratap Pothen as David
 Rajasekhar as Rajasekhar
 Y. G. Mahendran
 Janagaraj
 Chitra Lakshmanan
Ra. Sankaran as Seetha's father

Production 
AVM Productions wanted to make a film with Bharathiraja after the success of his Puthiya Vaarpugal which never happened. Few years later they both collaborated on the project which eventually became Pudhumai Penn. It marked the acting debut of Dr. Rajasekhar. It was also Pandiyan's only collaboration with AVM. Revathi was 17 years old when doing this film. The studio's name was prefixed to the film's title (AVMin Pudhumai Penn, meaning AVM's Modern Woman).

Soundtrack 
The soundtrack was composed by Ilaiyaraaja, while the lyrics were written by Vairamuthu.

Release and reception 
Pudhumai Penn was released on 14 July 1984, and ran for 208 days in the Mini Priya theatre, Madurai. The film failed during its first run. M. G. Ramachandran, then the chief minister of Tamil Nadu, decided to re-release the film with tax exemption by reducing ticket prices to three rupees which led to huge success at box-office. Jayamanmadhan of Kalki praised the performances of cast and direction but was critical of logical mistakes and found the climax of Revathi leaving home disappointing and added the film can be enjoyed in bits and pieces here and there. In 2014, Malathi Rangarajan of The Hindu praised Revathi's performance, but noted that the melodrama quotient was "a little too high".

References

Bibliography

External links 

1980s Tamil-language films
1984 drama films
1984 films
AVM Productions films
Films about women in India
Films directed by Bharathiraja
Films scored by Ilaiyaraaja
Indian drama films
Indian feminist films